The 8th British Academy Video Game Awards (known for the purposes of sponsorship as GAME British Academy Video Games Awards) awarded by the British Academy of Film and Television Arts, was an award ceremony held on 16 March 2012 in the London Hilton. The ceremony honoured achievement in video gaming in 2011 and was hosted by Dara Ó Briain.

Winners and nominees
Winners are shown first in bold.
{| class=wikitable
| valign="top" width="50%" |

Batman: Arkham City – Rocksteady Studios/Warner Bros. Interactive EntertainmentAssassin's Creed: Revelations – Ubisoft Montreal/Ubisoft
Call of Duty: Modern Warfare 3 – Infinity Ward and Sledgehammer Games/Activision
Deus Ex: Human Revolution – Eidos Montréal/Square Enix
Portal 2 – Valve/Valve
Uncharted 3: Drake’s Deception – Naughty Dog/Sony Computer Entertainment
| valign="top" |Monstermind – Bossa Studios/Bossa StudiosGardens of Time – Playdom/Playdon
I Am Playr – We R Interactive/Big Balls Productions
Global Resistance – Insomniac Games/Insomniac Games
Skylanders: Spyro’s Universe – Frima Studio/Activision
The Sims Social – Playfish/Electronic Arts
|-
| valign="top" width="50%" |Rayman Origins – UbisoftBatman: Arkham City – Rocksteady Studios/Warner Bros. Interactive Entertainment
L.A. Noire – Team Bondi/Rockstar Games
LittleBigPlanet 2 – Media Molecule
The Elder Scrolls V: Skyrim – Bethesda Game Studios
Uncharted 3: Drake’s Deception – Naughty Dog
| valign="top" |Battlefield 3 – EA DICE/Electronic ArtsAssassin's Creed: Revelations – Ubisoft Montreal/Ubisoft
Call of Duty: Modern Warfare 3 – Infinity Ward and Sledgehammer Games/Activision
Dark Souls – FromSoftware/Namco Bandai Games
Gears of War 3 – Epic Games/Microsoft Game Studios
LittleBigPlanet 2 – Media Molecule/Sony Computer Entertainment Europe
|-
| valign="top" width="50%" |Battlefield 3 – EA DICE/Electronic ArtsBatman: Arkham City – Rocksteady Studios/Warner Bros. Interactive Entertainment
Call of Duty: Modern Warfare 3 – Infinity Ward and Sledgehammer Games/Activision
Dead Space 2 – Visceral Games/Electronic Arts
The Nightjar – Somethin' Else/Somethin' Else
Uncharted 3: Drake’s Deception – Naughty Dog/Sony Computer Entertainment
| valign="top" |L.A. Noire – Andrew Hale, Simon Hale, Team Bondi/Rockstar GamesAssassin's Creed: Revelations – Jesper Kyd, Lorne Balfe, Ubisoft Montreal/Ubisoft
Batman: Arkham City – Nick Arundel, Ron Fish, Rocksteady Studios/Warner Bros. Interactive Entertainment
Deus Ex: Human Revolution – Michael McCann, Eidos Montréal/Square Enix
The Elder Scrolls V: Skyrim – Jeremy Soule, Bethesda Game Studios/Bethesda Softworks
Uncharted 3: Drake’s Deception – Greg Edmonson, Naughty Dog/Sony Computer Entertainment
|-
| valign="top" width="50%" |Portal 2 – Valve/ValveBatman: Arkham City – Rocksteady Studios/Warner Bros. Interactive Entertainment
FIFA 12 – EA Canada/EA Sports
L.A. Noire – Team Bondi/Rockstar Games
The Elder Scrolls V: Skyrim – Bethesda Game Studios/Bethesda Softworks
The Legend of Zelda: Skyward Sword – Nintendo EAD/Nintendo
| valign="top" |Mark Hamill – Batman: Arkham City as The Joker
Aaron Staton – L.A. Noire as Cole Phelps
Nolan North – Uncharted 3: Drake’s Deception as Nathan Drake
Stephen Fry  – LittleBigPlanet 2Stephen Merchant  – Portal 2 as Wheatley
Togo Igawa  – Total War: Shogun 2 as Dipolomat, Advisor and Military General
|-
| valign="top" width="50%" |Insanely Twisted Shadow Planet – Shadow Planet Productions/Microsoft StudiosBastion – Supergiant Games/Warner Bros. Interactive Entertainment
Eufloria – Alex May, Rudolf Kremers, Brian Grainger, Omni Systems Limited/Headup Games
L.A. Noire – Team Bondi/Rockstar Games
Monstermind – Bossa Studios/Bossa Studios
Rift – Trion Worlds/Trion Worlds
| valign="top" |Kinect Sports: Season Two – Rare and BigPark/Microsoft StudiosDance Central 2 – Harmonix/Microsoft Game Studios
DiRT 3 – Codemasters/Codemasters
F1 2011 – Codemasters/Codemasters
FIFA 12 – EA Canada/EA Sports
Your Shape Fitness Evolved 2012 – Ubisoft/Ubisoft
|-
| valign="top" width="50%" |Portal 2 – Valve/ValveBatman: Arkham City – Rocksteady Studios/Warner Bros. Interactive Entertainment
L.A. Noire – Team Bondi/Rockstar Games
LittleBigPlanet 2 – Media Molecule/Sony Computer Entertainment Europe
Super Mario 3D Land – Nintendo EAD Tokyo/Nintendo
The Elder Scrolls V: Skyrim – Bethesda Game Studios/Bethesda Softworks
| valign="top" |Portal 2 – Erik Wolpaw, Jay Pinkerton, Chet Faliszek, Valve/ValveBatman: Arkham City – Paul Dini, Paul Crocker, Sefton Hill, Rocksteady Studios/Warner Bros. Interactive Entertainment
Deus Ex: Human Revolution – Mary DeMarle, Eidos Montréal/Square Enix
L.A. Noire – Brendan McNamara, Team Bondi/Rockstar Games
The Elder Scrolls V: Skyrim – Emil Pagliarulo, Bethesda Game Studios/Bethesda Softworks
Uncharted 3: Drake’s Deception – Amy Hennig, Naughty Dog/Sony Computer Entertainment
|-
| valign="top" width="50%" |LittleBigPlanet 2 – Media Molecule/Sony Computer Entertainment EuropeDance Central 2 – Harmonix/Microsoft Game Studios
Kinect Sports: Season Two – Rare and BigPark/Microsoft Studios
Lego Pirates of the Caribbean: The Video Game – Traveller's Tales/Disney Interactive Studios
Lego Star Wars III: The Clone Wars – Traveller's Tales/LucasArts
Mario Kart 7 – Nintendo EAD Group No. 1 and Retro Studios/Nintendo
| valign="top" |Total War: Shogun 2 – Creative Assembly/SegaDark Souls – FromSoftware/Namco Bandai Games
Deus Ex: Human Revolution – Eidos Montréal/Square Enix
Football Manager 2012 – Sports Interactive/Sega
From Dust – Ubisoft Montpellier/Ubisoft
Tom Clancy's Ghost Recon: Shadow Wars – Ubisoft Sofia/Ubisoft
|-
| valign="top" width="50%" |LittleBigPlanet 2 – Media Molecule/Sony Computer Entertainment EuropeBastion – Supergiant Games/Warner Bros. Interactive Entertainment
Child of Eden – Q Entertainment/Ubisoft
From Dust – Ubisoft Montpellier/Ubisoft
L.A. Noire – Team Bondi/Rockstar Games
The Legend of Zelda: Skyward Sword – Nintendo EAD/Nintendo
| valign="top" |Tick Tock Toys – Swallowtail GamesJoust – Digital Knights
Dreamweaver – Evolved Ape
|-
| valign="top" width="50%" |Peggle HD – PopCap GamesDead Space iOS – IronMonkey Studios/Electronic Arts
Magnetic Billiards: Blueprint – Ste and John Pickford
Quarrel – Denki/UTV Ignition Entertainment
Super Mario 3D Land – Nintendo EAD Tokyo/Nintendo
The Nightjar – Somethin' Else/Somethin' Else
| valign="top" |Battlefield 3 – EA DICE/Electronic ArtsBatman: Arkham City – Rocksteady Studios/Warner Bros. Interactive Entertainment
Call of Duty: Modern Warfare 3 – Infinity Ward and Sledgehammer Games/Activision
FIFA 12 – EA Canada/EA Sports
L.A. Noire – Team Bondi/Rockstar Games
The Legend of Zelda: Skyward Sword – Nintendo EAD/Nintendo
Minecraft – Mojang/Mojang
Portal 2 – Valve/Valve
The Elder Scrolls V: Skyrim – Bethesda Game Studios/Bethesda Softworks
Uncharted 3: Drake’s Deception – Naughty Dog, Naughty Dog/Sony Computer Entertainment
|}

Special
 Markus Persson'''

Multiple nominations and wins

Games with multiple nominations and wins

Nominations

Wins

External links
8th BAFTA Video Games Awards page

British Academy Games Awards ceremonies
2012 awards in the United Kingdom
2011 in video gaming
March 2012 events in the United Kingdom